Judit Medgyesi (born 23 September 1956) is a Hungarian basketball player. She competed in the women's tournament at the 1980 Summer Olympics.

References

External links
 

1956 births
Living people
Hungarian women's basketball players
Olympic basketball players of Hungary
Basketball players at the 1980 Summer Olympics
People from Tokaj
Sportspeople from Borsod-Abaúj-Zemplén County